The midline nuclear group (or midline thalamic nuclei) is a region of the thalamus consisting of the following nuclei:
 paraventricular nucleus of thalamus (nucleus paraventricularis thalami) - not to be confused with paraventricular nucleus of hypothalamus
 paratenial nucleus (nucleus parataenialis) 
 nucleus reuniens  
 rhomboid nucleus (nucleus commissuralis rhomboidalis)
 subfascicular nucleus (nucleus subfascicularis)

The midline nuclei are often called "nonspecific" in that they project widely to the cortex and elsewhere. This has led to the assumption that they may be involved in general functions such as alerting. However, anatomical connections might suggest more specific functions, with the paraventricular and paratenial nuclei involved in viscero-limbic functions, and the reuniens and rhomboid nuclei involved in multimodal sensory processing.

References

Thalamic nuclei